1920 Horrors of the Heart is an upcoming Indian horror film produced and directed by Krishna Bhatt and written by Mahesh Bhatt. It is the fifth film of 1920 film series. It stars Avika Gor and Rahul Dev in lead roles.

Cast 
 Avika Gor
 Rahul Dev
 Barkha Bisht
 Randheer Rai
 Danish Pandor
 Ketaki Kulkarni
 Amit Behl
 Avtar Gill

Release 
The film’s teaser was released on 24 February 2023 under Zee Music Company.

References

External links
 

2020s Hindi-language films
2023 films
2023 horror films
Films set in 1920
Films set in Mumbai
Films set in the British Raj
Indian historical horror films
Reliance Entertainment films